The 1999 Nigerian Senate election in Abia State was held on February 20, 1999, to elect members of the Nigerian Senate to represent Abia State. Ike Nwachukwu representing Abia North, and Adolphus Wabara representing Abia South won on the platform of the Peoples Democratic Party, while Bob Nwannunu representing Abia Central won on the platform of All Nigeria Peoples Party.

Overview

Summary

Results

Abia North 
The election was won by Ike Nwachukwu of the Peoples Democratic Party.

Abia Central 
The election was won by Bob Nwannunu of the All Nigeria Peoples Party.

Abia South 
The election was won by Adolphus Wabara of the Peoples Democratic Party.

References 

February 1999 events in Nigeria
Abia State Senate elections
Abia